= Garry Connelly =

Australian deputy president (born 1947)

- Born: 1 March 1947 (age 79)
- Citizenship: Australian

Garry Connelly (born 1 March 1947) is an Australian deputy president of the FIA Institute, Director of the Australian Institute of Motor Sport Safety, F1 and WTCC Steward, and FIA World Motorsport Council Member.

He was awarded the Legion of Honour in 2009 for his services to Australian motorsport.
